The following is an incomplete list of current and defunct magazines published in Malaysia. They may be published in Malay or in other languages, including English and Chinese.

Women's magazine, comic magazines, film magazines and others are common in Malaysia. The first women's magazine was published in Malaysia in 1932. In the 2000s there were nearly fifty local titles addressing women in the country. These magazines also include those having an Islamic perspective. Some international women's magazines are also published in Malaysia. One of them is Elle Malaysia, which was first published in March 2014. Another one, Women’s Health, was started in April 2015.

A
Aliran Monthly
Aswaq

B
Bandwidth Street Press

C 

 Commercial Concept

D 

 Designer Concept

G
Galaxie
Gempak Starz
Glam
 Glam Lelaki
 Gusti

F
female

H
Harper's Bazaar
Her World
 Hijabista

I
 Intisari Magazine

K
Komik Manga Naruto
Kreko Magazine

M
Malaysia Insider
Mangga Magazine
Metropolitan Home
Mingguan Wanita
Motor Trader Magazine
Musotrees

N
 Nona
 Nur
 Nüyou

P
The Peak

R
The Rocket
Roda-Roda

S
Suasana Bintang Filem

T
Third World Resurgence
Tatler Malaysia 
Tatler Homes

U
Utusan Konsumer

W
Wanita

See also
 List of newspapers in Malaysia

References

 
Malaysia